The East Dixie League was an American professional minor league baseball league that operated for two seasons from 1934 to 1935 as a Class C level league.

History

The East Dixie League was created when the Dixie League split up into the East Dixie League and West Dixie League in 1934. Eleven cities were represented in the league; three were in Arkansas, two were in Louisiana, and six were in Mississippi. J. Alvin Gardner served as league president as the Jackson Mississippians won the 1934 championship and the Pine Bluff Judges won in 1935. The East Dixie League played two seasons as a Class C level league then became the Cotton States League.

Cities Represented 1934-1935
Baton Rouge, LA: Baton Rouge Red Sticks 1934 
Clarksdale, MS: Clarksdale Ginners 1934–1935 
Cleveland, MS: Cleveland Bengals 1935 
Columbus, MS: Columbus Bengals 1935 
El Dorado, AR: El Dorado Lions 1934–1935 
Greenville, MS: Greenville Buckshots 1934–1935 
Greenwood, MS: Greenwood Chiefs 1934–1935 
Helena, AR: Helena Seaporters 1935 
Jackson, MS: Jackson Mississippians 1934–1935 
Pine Bluff, AR: Pine Bluff Judges 1934–1935 
Shreveport, LA: Shreveport Sports 1934

Standings & Statistics

1934 East Dixie League
schedule
 Baton Rouge (19–29) moved to Clarksdale June 11Shreveport moved to Greenwood July 13 Playoffs: Jackson 4 games, Greenville 2.

1935 East Dixie League
schedule
  Columbus (28–32) moved to Cleveland June 18 Playoffs: Pine Bluff 4 games, Jackson 0.

References 

 
Defunct minor baseball leagues in the United States
Baseball leagues in Arkansas
Baseball leagues in Louisiana
Baseball leagues in Mississippi
Sports leagues established in 1934
Sports leagues disestablished in 1935
1934 establishments in the United States
1935 disestablishments in the United States